Tatev is a village and the center of the Tatev Municipality of the Syunik Province in Armenia. The village is home to the 9th-century Tatev Monastery, and hosts a station of the Wings of Tatev; the world's longest non-stop double track aerial tramway.

Demographics

Population 
The Statistical Committee of Armenia reported its population was 892 in 2010, down from 1,042 at the 2001 census.

Gallery

References 

Communities in Syunik Province
Populated places in Syunik Province
Mountain resorts in Armenia